Norberto Pereira Marinho Neto (born 19 July 1990), simply known as Norberto, is a Brazilian footballer who plays as a right back for Ponte Preta.

Honours
América-RN
Campeonato Potiguar: 2012
Copa RN: 2012, 2013
Copa Ecohouse: 2013

Vitória
Campeonato Baiano: 2016, 2017

América Mineiro
Campeonato Brasileiro Série B: 2017

Sport
Campeonato Pernambucano: 2019

CSA
Campeonato Alagoano: 2021

References

External links

1990 births
Living people
Association football defenders
Brazilian footballers
People from Brumado
Campeonato Brasileiro Série A players
Campeonato Brasileiro Série B players
América Futebol Clube (RN) players
Coritiba Foot Ball Club players
Esporte Clube Vitória players
América Futebol Clube (MG) players
Sport Club do Recife players
Centro Sportivo Alagoano players
Cruzeiro Esporte Clube players
Associação Atlética Ponte Preta players
Sportspeople from Bahia